This is a list of lakes in Slovenia. In Slovenia, there are 321 bodies of water classified as lakes, which includes intermittent lakes and artificial reservoirs. Most of the lakes in the country have glacial origin and many are intermittent because of the Karst surface. The largest glacial lakes are Lake Bled (147 ha) and Lake Bohinj (318 ha), and the largest intermittent lake is Lake Cerknica (2500 ha when completely filled).

Jezero is the Slovene word for lake.

B
Black Lake
Lake Blaguš
Lake Bled
Lake Bohinj
Lake Bukovnica

C
Lake Cerknica

D
Wild Lake
Double Lake 
Lake Družmir

G
Lake Gradišče 

J
Lake Jasna

K
Lake Komarnik
Lake Kreda
Lake Krn

L
Lake Ledava
Lakes Lovrenc

M
Lake Maribor

P
Lake Palčje
Lake Petelinje
Lake Planšar
Lake Ptuj

R
Lake Ribnica

Š
Lake Šalek 
Lake Šmartno

V
Lake Vogrsko

Z
Lake Zbilje
Lake Žovnek

See also

Further reading

 Firbas P. (2001). Vsa slovenska jezera: Leksikon slovenskih stoječih voda. Ljubljana: DZS. 368 pp.  

Slovenia
Lakes